Bossiaea rupicola is a species of flowering plant in the family Fabaceae and is endemic to eastern Australia. It is an erect shrub or small tree with silky-hairy, narrow egg-shaped to narrow elliptic leaves and red flowers with yellow markings.

Description
The leaves have silky hairs pressed against both surfaces, but become glabrous with age.

Taxonomy
Bossiaea rupicola was first formally in 1864 by George Bentham in Flora Australiensis from an unpublished description by Allan Cunningham.

Distribution and habitat
This pea grows in open forest, woodland and heathland, often between rocks and mostly occurs on the McPherson Range near the New South Wales - Queensland border, but also in the Kroombit Tops National Park and near Biloela and Biggenden further north.

References

External links 
 The Australasian Virtual Herbarium – Bossiaea rupicola occurrence data

rupicola
Flora of Queensland
Flora of New South Wales
Plants described in 1864
Taxa named by George Bentham